X hyperactivation refers to the process in Drosophila by which genes on the X chromosome in male flies become twice as active as genes on the X chromosome in female flies.

Because male flies have a single X chromosome and female flies have two X chromosomes, the higher level of activation in males ensures that X chromosome genes are overall expressed at the same level in males and females. X hyperactivation is one mechanism of dosage compensation, whereby organisms that use genetic sex determination systems balance the gene dosage from the sex chromosomes between males and females. X hyperactivation is regulated by the alternative splicing of a gene called sex-lethal. The gene was named sex-lethal due to its mutant phenotype which has little to no effect on male flies but results in the death of females due to X hyperactivation of the two X chromosomes. In female Drosophila, the sex-lethal protein causes the female-specific splicing of the sex-lethalgene to produce more of the sex-lethal protein. This produces a positive feedback loop as the sex-lethal protein splices the sex-lethal gene to produce more of the sex-lethal protein. In male Drosophila, there isn’t enough sex-lethal to activate the female-specific splicing of the sex-lethal gene, and it goes through the "default" splicing. This means that section of the gene that is spliced out in females remains in males. This portion contains an early stop codon resulting in no protein being made from it. In females, the sex-lethal protein inhibits the male-specific lethal (msl) gene complex that would normally activate X-linked genes that result in an increase in the male transcription rate. The msl gene complex was named due to the loss-of-function mutant that results in the improper increase in the male transcription rate that results in the death of males. In males, the absence of the necessary amount of sex-lethal allows for the increase in the male transcription rate due to the msl gene complex no longer being inhibited. This allows the expression of the X chromosome to be "doubled," or hyperactivated, to match the amount that females have with two X chromosomes.

The second dosage compensation that occurs in mammals are the balancing of X’s and autosomes. This regulation occurs by the upregulation of Xa, which is the active X. The upregulation of the active X shows increases in the activation of transcription and elongation. The X chromosome, compared to an autosomal gene, contains more silent genes which influences measuring the amount of influence active genes have. RNA-seq data was preformed and the autosomal and X linked gene outputs were significantly different. This agrees with the fact that X dosage compensation is in respect to autosomes. The loss of an X chromosome leads to an aneuploidy effect which disrupts the entire cell in Drosophila. This effect leads to the disruption of MSL (male specific lethal) from binding onto its target site. To overcome this, the X chromosome is first hyperactivated. Then, the hyperactivated X chromosome facilitates the inversion of the aneuploidy effect to create a gene expression equality between males and females. An aneuploidy effect is when the number of chromosomes is increased or decreased from normal. Natural selection occurs efficiently in Drosophila so the genes that are dosage-sensitive are increased. The dosage-sensitive genes vary from species to species.

References 

Genetics